Filip Zorvan (born 7 April 1996) is a Czech professional footballer who most recently played as a midfielder for Sigma Olomouc in the Czech First League.

References

External links

1996 births
Living people
People from Opočno
Czech footballers
Association football midfielders
Czech Republic youth international footballers
Czech First League players
Czech National Football League players
FC Hradec Králové players
FK Baník Sokolov players
MFK Vítkovice players
1. FK Příbram players
MFK Karviná players
Sportspeople from the Hradec Králové Region
SK Sigma Olomouc players